Sándor Szomori (November 6, 1910 in Budapest – October 27, 1989 in Budapest) was a Hungarian field handball player who competed in the 1936 Summer Olympics. He was part of the Hungarian field handball team, which finished fourth in the Olympic tournament. He played three matches.

References

1910 births
1989 deaths
Hungarian male handball players
Olympic handball players of Hungary
Field handball players at the 1936 Summer Olympics
Handball players from Budapest